Gajraj Singh  (born 31 July 1953) is an Indian politician who was a member of the 16th Legislative Assembly of Uttar Pradesh of India. In past, He has represented the Hapur constituency of Uttar Pradesh and is a member of the Rashtriya Lok Dal. He was a member of Indian National Congress political party until 2021. In 2017 assembly elections he lost to BJP Candidate.

Early life and  education
Gajraj Singh was  born in Hapur. He attended the Hariharnath Shastri Smarak Inter College and is educated till tenth grade.

Political career
Gajraj Singh has been a MLA for four terms. He represented the Hapur constituency during all his terms and is a member of the Indian National Congress political party. In 2017 assembly elections he lost to BJP Candidate. In 2022 he joined Rashtriya Lok Dal.

Posts held

See also
Hapur
Sixteenth Legislative Assembly of Uttar Pradesh
Uttar Pradesh Legislative Assembly

References 

Indian National Congress politicians
Uttar Pradesh MLAs 1985–1989
Uttar Pradesh MLAs 1989–1991
Uttar Pradesh MLAs 1991–1993
Uttar Pradesh MLAs 2012–2017
People from Hapur district
1953 births
Living people
Rashtriya Lok Dal politicians